Haydenville is an unincorporated community in Arena Township, Lac qui Parle County, in the U.S. state of Minnesota.

History
Haydenville was platted in 1910, and named for Herbert L. Hayden, the original owner of the town site.

References

Unincorporated communities in Lac qui Parle County, Minnesota
Unincorporated communities in Minnesota